Tiandong County() is a county of Guangxi, China. It is under the administration of the prefecture-level city of Baise.

Demographics
Tiandong's population was 411,500(2010). 85.22% of the people belong to the Zhuang ethnic group, and speak Youjiang Zhuang(). The rest include Han, Yao, Miao, and other ethnic groups.

Administration
From June 21, 2005, for administration Tiandong County is divided into 10 areas:

 Pingma Town, population: 103,00
 Xiangzhou Town, population: 49,200
 Linfeng Town, population: 50,800
 Silin Town, population: 62,000
 Yincha Town, population: 24,700
 Suoliang Town, population: 33,600
 Yiyu Town
 Napo Town, population: 16,000
 Zuodeng Yao Township

Transportation
Apart from road access including the G80 Guangzhou–Kunming Expressway, the county also has rail access via Tiandong Railway Station and via Tiandong North Railway Station which is part of the Nanning–Kunming high-speed railway network. The nearest air access in via Baise Bama Airport which is in the neighbouring Tianyang County.

Climate

Pictures

References

Counties of Guangxi
Counties and cities in Baise